The Amazonas gubernatorial election was held on October 3, 2010 to elect the next governor of Amazonas.  The PMN's Omar Aziz comfortably won reelection.

References

2010 Brazilian gubernatorial elections
October 2010 events in South America
Amazonas (Brazilian state) gubernatorial elections